Meadow View Addition is an unincorporated community and census-designated place in Minnehaha County, South Dakota, United States. Its population was 531 as of the 2020 census. The community is located on South Dakota Highway 115, north of Sioux Falls.

Geography

Demographics

References

Unincorporated communities in Minnehaha County, South Dakota
Unincorporated communities in South Dakota
Census-designated places in Minnehaha County, South Dakota
Census-designated places in South Dakota